William or Bill Chambers may refer to:

Sportspeople
Will Chambers (born 1988), Australian rugby league player
Bill Chambers (American football) (1923–1983), American football offensive lineman
Bill Chambers (basketball) (1930–2017), NCAA college record holder for rebounds
Bill Chambers (footballer) (1906–1978), English footballer
Bill Chambers (baseball) (1888–1962), Major League pitcher
William Chambers (footballer), English footballer

Politicians
William Chambers (Welsh politician) (1809–1882), son of William Chambers (industrialist)
William Chambers (MP) (died 1559)
William Chambers (publisher) (1800–1883), lord provost of Edinburgh
William Clarke Chambers (1862–19??), railway contractor and politician

Others
William Chambers (architect) (1723–1796), Born to Scottish parents in Sweden, architect, based in London
William Chambers (industrialist) (1774–1855), see Glamorgan Pottery
William Frederick Chambers (1786–1855), British doctor and Fellow of the Royal Society
William Chambers (milliner) (born 1979), Scottish hat designer
W. Paris Chambers (1854–1913), American composer, cornet soloist and bandmaster
William Lea Chambers (1852–1933), United States federal judge
Bill Chambers (musician), Australian musician
 Bill Chambers (film critic), see Toronto Film Critics Association

See also 
William Chambers Coker (1872–1953), American botanist
Chambers family